The  or , previously known as the Via Regia or King's Highway, was an ancient Roman road built by Emperor Trajan in the province of Arabia Petraea, from Aqaba on the Red Sea to Bostra. It was specifically known as the Via Traiana Nova in order to distinguish it from the Via Traiana in Italy.  It is occasionally also referred to simply as the 'Via Nova' or 'Via Nova Traiana' Its construction started shortly after the annexation of Arabia, supervised by governor Gaius Claudius Severus, and was completed under Hadrian.

Sources

Traiana Nova, Via
Trajan
Arabia Petraea